This is a list of Welsh mathematicians, who have contributed to the development of mathematics.

References

 Chambers, Ll. G. Mathemategwyr Cymru (Mathematicians of Wales), Cyd Bwyllgor Addysg Cymru, 1994.

External links
Welsh scientists Mathematicians, Scientists and Inventors

Welsh